The Hotel Hollywood is a building located on the corner of Foster and Hunt Streets in Surry Hills, inner city suburb of Sydney, New South Wales, Australia.

History

The building has aesthetic, historical and social significance. It is one of only five hotels "constructed in the Inter-War Functionalist style in the city during a short period between 1938 and 1942"; the others are the Australian (Broadway), the Civic, the Kegroom Tavern, and Sutherlands. The hotel is historically 'intact' having had no internal or external alterations of any kind. It is heritage listed as part of the Sydney Local Environmental Plan on 14 December 2012.

Once owned by Tooth and Company it was originally called the Nevada. The Hotel Hollywood acquired its name in 1940 due to its location to the nearby cinema related industry. It saw women drinking at its bars as early as 1950.  It is now most notable for its unpretentious, well worn, interior the spinning mirror ball and actress Doris Goddard. Goddard purchased the building in 1978 for $178,000 and remained its publican and proprietress for 42 years, up until her death in July 2019. In June 2021, the building was purchased by private investment firm Petersen Group for over $9 million.

Film and television credits 
The movie Tim was filmed at the Hotel Hollywood as was Erskineville Kings (1999), starring Hugh Jackman. The film clip Boots was filmed at the hotel and features Doris Goddard (actress and publican) singing and playing guitar in the credits. Other television series filmed at the Hollywood include Blue Murder, Brides of Christ, and Water Rats.

References

External links
 

Pubs in Sydney
Articles incorporating text from the New South Wales State Heritage Register
Hotel buildings completed in 1942